Notnamaia is a genus of primates that lived in Africa during the early middle Eocene. It contains one species, N. bogenfelsi. Its describers considered it to be an early simian, but other researchers have generally placed it within Strepsirrhini, possibly aligned with the djebelemurids or caenopithecines.

References

Literature cited 

 

Prehistoric strepsirrhines
Eocene primates
Fossil taxa described in 2014
Eocene mammals of Africa
Prehistoric primate genera